Warrandyte is a suburb of Melbourne, Victoria, Australia, 24 km north-east of Melbourne's Central Business District, located within the City of Manningham local government area.

Warrandyte is bounded in the west by the Mullum Mullum Creek and Target Road, in the north by the Yarra River, in the east by Jumping Creek and Anzac Road, and in the south by an irregular line from Reynolds Road, north of Donvale, Park Orchards and Warrandyte South.

Warrandyte was founded as a Victorian town, located in the once gold-rich rolling hills east of Melbourne, and is now on the north-eastern boundary of suburban Melbourne. Gold was first discovered in the town in 1851 and together, with towns like Bendigo and Ballarat, led the way in gold discoveries during the Victorian gold rush. Today Warrandyte retains much of its past in its surviving buildings of the Colonial period and remains a twin community with North Warrandyte, which borders the Yarra River to its north.

Etymology

In Australian Aboriginal mythology (see dreamtime), a Wurundjeri dreamtime story tells of a great eagle; "the all powerful, ever watchful creator of the world", named Bunjil, who "once gazed down upon his people from the star Altair and saw their wrong doing. Awaiting their return, with a mighty crash of thunder, he hurled down a star to destroy them". Where the star struck created a gorge in which much of the town today is located. Bunjil's people remembered the spot, and referred to it as Warrandyte, speculated to mean "that which is thrown".

History

In 1851, gold was first discovered in Victoria, in Warrandyte, at Anderson's Creek, by Louis Michel, the approximate location of the site is marked by a cairn on Fourth Hill, in the Warrandyte State Park. While some mining did occur in the area throughout the peak of the gold rush, it was not until the late 19th century, after gold discoveries reduced in the more popular regions, that the area around Warrandyte was intensively mined, particularly around Fourth Hill and Whipstick Gully. Some areas continued to be mined up until the 1960s. Warrandyte Post Office opened on 1 August 1857.

In the early 20th century, Warrandyte became a popular destination for artists of the Heidelberg School, who sought subject matter further into the bush. This led to the development of an artists camp and small colony. Though not as substantial as the older colonies at Heidelberg and Box Hill, several artists, such as Clara Southern and Walter Withers, who were associated with the Heidelberg School, took up residence in Warrandyte. Others followed, including Penleigh Boyd, Harold Herbert, Jo Sweatman and Gus McLaren.

Bushfires
Major bushfires have swept through Warrandyte throughout history, and the town was at the centre of the Black Friday bushfires in 1939, in which 71 people lost their lives. The 1962 fires also devastated North Warrandyte. Many houses were destroyed and many lives lost. In 2009 the Black Saturday fires in Kinglake were 15 minutes away from North Warrandyte. On 9 February 2014, a bushfire broke out in Warrandyte burning approximately 10 hectares and destroying 3 houses. Major bushfires to have swept through Warrandyte include:

1851 - 6 February "Black Thursday"
1939 - 13 January "Black Friday"
1962 -  14–16 January
2014 - 9 February

Geography

Warrandyte is situated on the southern banks of the Yarra River. The river and hills surrounding the town were once rich in gold and the ruins of mineshafts and tunnels can be found throughout the Warrandyte State Park, amongst other locations. While the central town itself is nestled into a gorge on the river, the suburb covers a reasonably large area of land and can be divided up into the following sections:

Central Warrandyte comprises the main street of Ringwood-Warrandyte Road and Heidelberg-Warrandyte Road (Yarra Street), Pound Bend and the southern banks of the Yarra River.

Andersons Creek flows from neighbouring South Warrandyte and Warranwood into the Yarra just before the beginning of Pound Bend. This area is where several gullies converge and create a geographical hole, with Fourth Hill to the east and the hills on the eastern banks of the Mullum Mullum Creek to the west. This becomes evident when driving through Warrandyte on Heidelberg-Warrandyte Road, as the hills guide the road down towards Andersons Creek.

The Eastern banks of the Mullum Mullum Creek were home to vast orchards overflowing from neighbouring East Doncaster and as a result, much of the vegetation has been cleared. Today the area is covered in large residential properties due to local council regulations allowing land to be subdivided into larger sites.

Transportation

Warrandyte is serviced primarily by the private car, however a bus service actively operates along the main roads of Ringwood-Warrandyte Road and Heidelberg-Warrandyte Road (Yarra Street).

Community

The Warrandyte Festival, one of the last remaining volunteer-run festivals in Victoria, is held every year in mid March. Typically, the festival features a variety of attractions. Many stalls sell local produce or crafts and there are numerous historical exhibits, as well as safety demonstrations by the CFA.
Warrandyte is serviced by the community newspaper Warrandyte Diary.
 established in 1970 by local screenwriter Cliff Green and Journalist Lee Tindale and  Cartoonist Jock Macneish. The Diary has provided news, information and entertainment to Warrandyte and its surrounding communities for more than 50 years.

Facilities

Warrandyte contains a general post office, tennis courts, a community centre, an RSL, several bed and breakfasts, restaurants, a police station, a Country Fire Authority fire station, two kindergartens, two recreational ovals (AFL Football and Cricket), Warrandyte Community Church, Uniting and Anglican places of worship, Andersons Creek Cemetery and a Scout hall, canoe launching ramps, a skatepark, nurseries and tearooms and the Crystal Brook Holiday Centre. It also has a thriving arts community including theatre, pottery and painting centred at the Mechanics Institute Hall.

Warrandyte has two completely community owned and run micro-retirement villages operated as a co-operative - unique in Victoria.

Educational Facilities in Warrandyte:
 Warrandyte High School
 Andersons Creek Primary School
 Warrandyte Primary School

Places of Worship:
St Stephen's Anglican Church, Stiggants Road 

Shopping Strips & Centres:
 Goldfields Plaza
 Street Shops either side of the Main Roads, around the main bridge.

Parklands and recreation

Activities include walking, bike riding, mountain biking, tennis, basketball, football (AFL), cricket, swimming in the Yarra River, canoeing, kayaking, skateboarding and bushwalking, among many others.

Parks, Gardens and Reserves in Warrandyte:
 Warrandyte State Park (including Pound Bend, Fourth Hill, Black Flat, Mount Lofty and other areas)
 Pound Bend Reserve
 Stiggants Reserve
 Warrandyte Reserve/Taroona Reserve (Home to the Warrandyte Cricket Club, which was formed in 1855, Warrandyte "The Bloods" Football Club, competing in the Eastern Football League and Junior Football Clubs and Warrandyte Netball Club)
 Longridge Farm
 Alexander Reserve
 Currawong Bush Park (Environment Centre and Wildlife Enclosure)
 Wildflower Reserve
 Andersons Creek Streamside Reserve

See also
 City of Doncaster and Templestowe – Warrandyte was previously within this former local government area.
 Electoral district of Warrandyte
 List of Melbourne suburbs
 Victorian gold rush
 Manningham Municipal Council Offices (see City of Manningham)

References

External links
 

Suburbs of Melbourne
Suburbs of the City of Manningham
Mining towns in Victoria (Australia)